The 1927–28 Drexel Engineers men's basketball team represented Drexel Institute of Art, Science and Industry during the 1927–28 men's basketball season. The Engineers, led by 1st year head coach Walter Halas, played their home games at Main Building.

Roster

Schedule

|-
!colspan=9 style="background:#F8B800; color:#002663;"| Regular season
|-

References

Drexel Dragons men's basketball seasons
Drexel
1927 in sports in Pennsylvania
1928 in sports in Pennsylvania